Aliabad (also Romanized as `Aliābād; also known as ‘Alīābād-e Chahār Bīsheh) is a village in Tombi Golgir Rural District, Golgir District, Masjed Soleyman County, Khuzestan Province, Iran. At the 2006 census, its population was 20, in 4 families.

References 

Populated places in Masjed Soleyman County